United States gubernatorial elections were held in November 1963, in two states. Kentucky and Mississippi hold their gubernatorial elections in odd numbered years, every 4 years, preceding the United States presidential election year.

References

 
November 1963 events in the United States